Harald Meier (1922 – 2007) was a German herpetologist.

Taxa described by Meier
Meier described several new taxa of geckos, including Phelsuma pusilla hallmanni and Phelsuma borbonica mater, subspecies of geckos.

Taxa named in honor of Meier
Meier is commemorated in the scientific names of three taxa:
Mantella haraldmeieri 
Geoscincus haraldmeieri 
Zonosaurus haraldmeieri

References

1922 births
2007 deaths
German herpetologists
20th-century German zoologists